Madeleine Darya Alizadeh (born 1989 in Vienna, Austria), known as dariadaria, is an Austrian author, podcast host, activist and entrepreneur.

Life and career 
Madeleine Darya Alizadeh, daughter of an Austrian mother and an Iranian father, grew up in Vienna, where she studied Political Science and Ethnology, among other subjects. In 2017, Alizadeh founded her own fashion label dariadéh.

From September 2017 to January 2020, Alizadeh has been producing a podcast under the title a mindful mess. In August 2019, she published the book Starkes weiches Herz. In week 38/2019, the book had its highest ranking of 3rd in the Literatur-Spiegel bestseller list of paperback nonfiction books. She also wrote an essay for the book Unlearn Patriarchy which also became a Spiegel bestseller. In 2019 Alizadeh ran for election with Austria's Green Party. 

Alizadeh lives in Vienna and produces content about sustainable fashion,feminism,  environmentalism and social justice.

References 

Writers from Vienna
Living people
21st-century Austrian women writers
YouTube vloggers
Austrian Internet celebrities
Women podcasters
YouTube channels launched in 2012
1989 births